Elisabetta Gualmini (born 17 May 1968 in Modena) is an Italian politician who was elected as a Member of the European Parliament in 2019.

Political career
In parliament, Gualmini has been serving on the Committee on Budgets and on the Committee on Employment and Social Affairs since 2019. 

In addition to her committee assignments, Gualmini is part of the Parliament's delegation to the EU-Russia Parliamentary Cooperation Committee. She is also a member of the European Parliament Intergroup on Anti-Racism and Diversity, the European Parliament Intergroup on Western Sahara and the European Parliament Intergroup on Fighting against Poverty.

References

1968 births
Living people
MEPs for Italy 2019–2024
21st-century women MEPs for Italy
Democratic Party (Italy) MEPs